Brokeback Mountain is a 2005 American romantic drama film directed by Ang Lee.

Brokeback Mountain may also refer to:

 Brokeback Mountain (opera), by American composer Charles Wuorinen, 2014
 Brokeback Mountain (short story), by American author Annie Proulx, 1997